Off the Map is a VHS and DVD released by the American alternative rock band Red Hot Chili Peppers in 2001, two years following the release of their seventh studio album, Californication. The video runs as a full concert but is edited to include parts from various concerts from the band's 2000s North American tour.

While being the first official live release from the band, it also is their only full live CD/DVD to have live performances of songs from the albums Freaky Styley, Uplift Mofo Party Plan or One Hot Minute.

During "Me and My Friends", Foo Fighters members Dave Grohl and Taylor Hawkins prank Chad Smith as revenge for Smith's pranks prior to the show, causing the band to screw up at the end. 

In 2003, Off the Map was certified platinum in Australia. In 2008, it was certified Gold in United States. The material was also certified Gold in Brazil and United Kingdom.

Track listing
 Opening
 "Around the World"
 "Give It Away"
 "Usually Just a T-Shirt #3"
 "Scar Tissue"
 "Suck My Kiss"
 "If You Have to Ask"
 "Subterranean Homesick Blues"
 "Otherside"
 "Blackeyed Blonde"
 "Pea"
 "Blood Sugar Sex Magik"
 "Easily"
 "What Is Soul?"
 (The Jam)
 "Fire"
 "Californication"
 "Right on Time" 
 "Under the Bridge"
 "Me and My Friends"

Bonus footage
 Pre-show backstage footage
 Interview footage
 Additional live footage:
 "Skinny Sweaty Man"
 "I Could Have Lied"
 "Parallel Universe"
 "Sir Psycho Sexy"
 "Search and Destroy"

Certifications

References

Red Hot Chili Peppers video albums
2001 video albums
2001 live albums
Live video albums
Warner Records live albums
Warner Records video albums